Zhangixalus feae is a species of frog in the family Rhacophoridae. It is found in southwestern Yunnan (China), northern Laos, northern and central highlands of Vietnam, northern Thailand, and Myanmar. The specific name feae honors Leonardo Fea, an Italian explorer, zoologist, and naturalist.

Its natural habitats are closed-canopy evergreen rainforests, but it can adapt to human presence. Breeding takes place in streams, ponds, and paddy fields as well as holes in trees; it seems to require large trees. It is threatened by habitat loss and collecting for consumption, at least in the past.

Individuals of Zhangixalus feae are capable of gliding by spreading the webbing between their fingers and toes. They eat small invertebrates, including insects, spiders, and millipedes.

References

feae
Amphibians of Myanmar
Amphibians of China
Amphibians of Laos
Amphibians of Thailand
Amphibians of Vietnam
Amphibians described in 1893
Taxonomy articles created by Polbot